Solheimsviken is a bay and a neighbourhood in the city of Bergen in Vestland county, Norway. The bay is situated at the end of the Damsgårdssundet strait, near the large Store Lungegårdsvann bay.  Located near the city centre of Bergen, Solheimsviken was the first urbanized area in the municipality of Årstad (which is now Årstad borough in the city of Bergen).

Solheimsviken has traditionally been dominated by heavy industry, although none of this remains. In recent years, inner Solheimsviken has been developed into a business park with the presence of several companies including the headquarters of GC Rieber, as well as the convention centre Arenum. There are further plans for new combined hotel and convention centre as well as a new regional headquarters for the financial group DNB.

References

Geography of Bergen